Nectandra sordida is a species of plant in the family Lauraceae. It is endemic to Bolivia and Peru.   It is threatened by habitat loss.

References

sordida
Trees of Bolivia
Trees of Peru
Vulnerable flora of South America
Taxonomy articles created by Polbot